Floyd Prozanski (born 1954) is an American Democratic politician who is a current member of the Oregon State Senate, representing the 4th District, since 2004.  He previously served in the Oregon House of Representatives, from 1995 through 2000 and again for the 2003 session. He resigned from the House in December 2003 to accept appointment to the Senate seat that had been vacated by Tony Corcoran. He won election to the seat in November 2004.

Career
Senate District 4 includes parts of Lane and Douglas Counties, including the communities of Eugene, Roseburg, Cottage Grove, Sutherlin, Oakland, Elkton, and Oakridge. Prozanski serves as chair of the Senate Judiciary Committee and as a member of the Senate General Government, Consumer and Small Business Protection Committee as well as the Rural Communities and Economic Development Committee. He co-chairs the Task Force on Public Safety and serves on the Justice Reinvestment Grant Review Committee, the Task Force on Resolution of Adverse Health Care Incidents, the Oregon Law Commission, the Oregon Criminal Justice Commission (CJC), the Asset Forfeiture Oversight Advisory Committee of the CJC, and the Oregon State Council for Interstate Adult Offender Supervision.

The Independent Party of Oregon awarded Prozanski a 100% "A" rating. He has also been named "Top Dog" by the Oregon Humane Society.

The Register-Guard called Prozanski a "hard-working and responsive'" senator who takes a thoughtful approach to public policy.  The News-Review says Prozanksi can point to substantial accomplishments as a legislator in economic development, law enforcement, land use and natural resources.

When the legislature is not in session, Prozanski works as a prosecutor and serves on various local boards and commissions. He graduated from Texas A&M University and later earned a J.D. degree from the South Texas College of Law. A cyclist and home-brewer, he has lived in Eugene with his wife for more than 25 years.

Senate recall effort
Prozanski faced the possibility of a recall election in 2015 after Oregon Pro-Gun Rights advocates attempted to gather more than 10,000 signatures.  The organizers of the recall effort cited Sen. Prozanski's sponsorship of SB.941 which is the State's background check expansion law. Ultimately the recall effort failed.

References

External links 
 Campaign website
 Legislative website
Follow the Money - Floyd Prozanski
2006 2004 2002 1998 1996 1994 campaign contributions

1954 births
Living people
Texas A&M University alumni
South Texas College of Law alumni
Democratic Party Oregon state senators
Democratic Party members of the Oregon House of Representatives
21st-century American politicians